Galatea is an ancient Greek name meaning "she who is milk-white".

Galatea, Galathea or Gallathea may refer to:

In mythology
 Galatea, three different mythological figures from Greek mythology

In the arts
 Aci, Galatea e Polifemo, cantata by Handel
 Galatea (Raphael), or The Triumph of Galatea, a 1512 fresco of Ovid's sea-nymph
 Gallathea, a late sixteenth-century play by John Lyly
 Galatea, or Pygmalion Reversed, an 1883 musical comedy by Henry Pottinger Stephens, W. Webster and Meyer Lutz
 Galatea, a 2009 play by Lawrence Aronovitch
 La Galatea, a sixteenth-century pastoral novel by Miguel de Cervantes
 Galatea (novel), a 1953 novel by James M. Cain
 Galatea, a 1976 novel by Philip Pullman
 , a 1977 ballet film with Ekaterina Maximova and Māris Liepa
 Galatea 2.2, a 1995 novel by Richard Powers
 Galatea (video game), released in 2000
 Galatea, a main figure in the Pygmalion and the Image series of four paintings by Sir Edward Coley Burne-Jones (1878)
 Galatea, a major character in Pamphilus de amore, a widely-read poem from 1200
 Galatea of the Spheres, a 1952 painting by Salvador Dalí

Fictional characters
 Galatea, in the manga Claymore by Norihiro Yagi
 Galatea, an android in the 2007 novel Soon I Will Be Invincible by Austin Grossman
 Galatea, a villain in the 1990s Japanese anime series Bubblegum Crisis: Tokyo 2040
 Galatea, a supervillain appearing in Justice League Unlimited
 Galatea, a female robot in the film Bicentennial Man
 Galathea, a cow in the J. R. R. Tolkien novel Farmer Giles of Ham
 Galatea, a character in the mobile game Fate/Grand Order
 Galatea Dunkel, in the 1957 novel On the Road by Jack Kerouac

In science
 74 Galatea, a large main belt asteroid
 Galatea, a moon of Neptune
 Galathea, a genus of squat lobsters
 Galatea, common name for plants of the genus Dieffenbachia

Places
 Galatea, New Zealand, a village in the North Island
 Galatea, Ohio, a community in the United States
 Mount Galatea, in the Canadian Rockies
 Galathea National Park, a national park in the Nicobar Islands, India

Ships
 List of ships named Galatea

Other uses
 Galatea (locomotive), a preserved example of the LMS Jubilee class of steam locomotive
 Galatea II a Thoroughbred racehorse
 Galatea, a type of cotton twill fabric
 Galatea AB, a Swedish beverage distributor

See also
 Galathée (disambiguation)
 Galatia (disambiguation)